The Benjamin Adams House is a historic house located at 85 North Main Street, in Uxbridge, Massachusetts.  Probably built before 1792, it is a good quality example of Federal period architecture, built for a prominent local lawyer and businessman.  On October 7, 1983, it was listed on the National Register of Historic Places.

Description and history
The Benjamin Adams House is located north of the center of Uxbridge, on the east side of North Main Street just beyond its junction with Seagrave Street.  It is a -story wood-frame structure, with a side-gable roof and symmetrically placed interior brick chimneys.  The exterior is finished in aluminum siding, but retains its five-bay front facade.  The main entrance is sheltered by a shallow hip-roof portico, supported by paired paneled square columns, which rise to an entablature and modillioned eave.  The entrance is framed by sidelight windows and topped by a semi-oval fanlight window.  An enclosed hip-roof porch extends across the right side.  The house had an associated 19th-century barn into the late 20th century; a modern block of condominiums extends to the rear over its site.

The house was most likely built sometime before 1792; it exhibits high-quality Federal styling despite the application of modern siding. Benjamin Adams, probably its first owner, was an early 19th-century United States Congressman, lawyer, and banker.  For much of the 19th century, it was owned by members of the Gunn family, including a manufacturer of men's suits and a pharmacist.

See also
National Register of Historic Places listings in Uxbridge, Massachusetts

References

Houses in Uxbridge, Massachusetts
National Register of Historic Places in Uxbridge, Massachusetts
Houses on the National Register of Historic Places in Worcester County, Massachusetts
Federal architecture in Massachusetts